Carder Hazard (August 11, 1734 – November 24, 1792) was a justice of the Rhode Island Supreme Court from May 1792 until his death in December 1792, midway through a term that would have expired in May 1793.

Hazard's name first appears in records in  1757, as an admitted freeman of the Colony from South Kingstown, Rhode Island. He was described as "tall and well formed, fair in complexion, and (tradition says) an uncommonly handsome man". He was a son of George Hazard, and a brother of Newport mayor George Hazard. Hazard held various public offices over the course of his life, culminating in his service on the Rhode Island Supreme Court.

Hazard married Alice Hull on September 23, 1756. She died on July 1, 1760, at the age of 21. On March 5, 1761, Hazard married Alice Hazard, a distant cousin, who died weeks after Hazard, on January 13, 1793. Hazard died in a fall from a chair that he stood on to take a book from the top of a bookcase, at the house of his son, Doctor George Hazard. An obituary notice, published in the Providence Gazette on December 1, 1792, said:

References

1734 births
1792 deaths
People from South Kingstown, Rhode Island
Justices of the Rhode Island Supreme Court
Hazard family of Rhode Island